Events in the year 1866 in India.

Incumbents
 Sir John Lawrence, Governor-General of India, 12 January 1864 – 12 January 1869
 Colonel Edmund Haythorne, Adjutant-General of India, 22 June 1860–January 1866
 Ram Singh II, Maharao of Kota State, 20 July 1828 – 27 March 1866
 Sagramji II Devaji (Sagramji Bhanabhai), Thakur of Gondal State, 1851-14 December 1869
 Bham Pratap Singh, Raja and Maharajah of Bijawar State, 23 November 1847 – 15 September 1899
 Shri Singh, Raja of Chamba State, 1844-1870
 Ranmalsinhji Amarsinhji, Raj Sahib of Dhrangadhra State, 9 April 1843 – 16 October 1869
 Madan Pal, Maharaja of Karauli State, 4 March 1854 – 16 August 1869
 Hiravajra Singh Deo, Maharajah of Patna, 1848-August 1866
 Cecil Beadon, Lieutenant-Governor of Bengal, 1862-1866
 Afzal ad-Dawlah, Asaf Jah V, Nizam of Hyderabad, 16 May 1857 – 26 February 1869
 Charles Pelly, revenue member of the Madras Legislative Council, 1862-1866

Events
 British India defeated Bhutan, annexing parts of the Assam Duars, Bengal Duars, and Dewangiri (Western Duars
 Shapoorji Pallonji Group, Mumbai based business conglomerate, was founded
 Shergotty meteorite fell at Sherghati, Gaya, Bihar, India
 P&O Bank purchased Allahabad Bank
 Bombay Castle wall was demolished

Law
Indian Succession Act
Government Of India Act
India Office Site & Approaches Act
Indian High Courts Act
Indian Forest Acts, 1865 and 1878 extended the British Colonial claims over forests in India.

Births
 Charles Astley Fowler, Divisional Commander during the Third Afghan War in 1919, born on 9 November
 William Birdwood, Commander-in-Chief of the Fifth Army on the Western Front in World War I, born on 13 September in Khadki
 Lucy Deane Streatfeild, civil servant, a social worker, and one of the first female factory inspectors in the United Kingdom; she was one of the first to raise concerns about the health risks arising from exposure to asbestos, born on 31 July in Madras
 Edward Allan Wood, Commandant of the Auxiliary Division during the Irish War of Independence, born on 6 May
 Lala Lajpat Rai, leader in the Indian Independence movement, born on 28 January in Dhudike, Punjab
 Bessie Sinclair Speechly, a Speechly, born on 31 August in Cottayam, India

Deaths
 Alexander Kinloch Forbes, scholar of the Gujarati language and a colonial administrator in British India, died in Pune

References

 
India
Years of the 19th century in India